The Quebec sovereignty movement is a political movement whose objective is to achieve the independence of Quebec from Canada. Sovereignists suggest that the people of Quebec make use of their right to self-determination a principle that includes the possibility of choosing between integration with a third state, political association with another state or independence so that Québécois, collectively and by democratic means, give themselves a sovereign state with its own independent constitution.

Quebec sovereigntists believe that such a sovereign state, the Quebec nation, will be better equipped to promote its own economic, social, ecological and cultural development. Quebec's sovereignist movement is based on Quebec nationalism.

Overview

Ultimately, the goal of Quebec's sovereignist movement is to make Quebec an independent state. In practice, the terms “independentist”, “sovereignist” and “separatist” are used to describe people adhering to this movement, although the latter term is perceived as pejorative by those concerned as it de-emphasizes that the sovereignty project aims to achieve political independence without severing economic connections with Canada. Most of the Prime Minister of Canada's political speeches use the term "sovereignist" in French in order to moderate remarks made on the Québécois electorate. In English, the term separatist is often used in order to accentuate the negative dimension of the project.

The idea of Quebec sovereignty is based on a nationalist vision and interpretation of historical facts and sociological realities in Quebec, which attest to the existence of a Québécois people and a Quebec nation. On November 27, 2006, the House of Commons of Canada adopted, by 266 votes to 16, a motion recognizing that “Québécois form a nation within a united Canada”. On November 30, the National Assembly of Quebec unanimously adopted a motion recognizing "the positive character" of the motion adopted by Ottawa and proclaiming that said motion did not diminish "the inalienable rights, the constitutional powers and the privileges of the “National Assembly and of the Quebec nation”.

Sovereignists believe that the natural final outcome of the Québécois people's collective adventure and development is the achievement of political independence, which is only possible if Quebec becomes a sovereign state and if its inhabitants not only govern themselves through independent democratic political institutions, but are also free to establish external relations and makes international treaties without the federal government of Canada being involved.

Through parliamentarism, Quebecers currently possess a certain democratic control over the Quebec state. However, within the Canadian federation as it is currently constituted, Quebec does not have all the constitutional powers that would allow it to act as a true national government. Furthermore, the policies pursued by Quebec and those pursued by the federal government often come into conflict. So far, various attempts to reform the Canadian federal system have failed (most notably the defunct Meech Lake Accord and Charlottetown Accord), due to conflicting interests between the sovereignist elites of Quebec and the federalist elites of Quebec, as well as with the rest of Canada (see Constitutional Debate in Canada).

Although Quebec's independence movement is a political movement, cultural and social concerns that are much older than the sovereignist movement, as well as Quebecers' national identity, are also at the base for the desire to emancipate Quebec's population. One of the main cultural arguments sovereigntists cite is that if Quebec were independent, Quebecers would have a national citizenship, which would solve the problem of Québécois cultural identity in the North American context (ex. who is a Québécois and who is not, what is uniquely Quebecois, etc.). Another example is that by establishing an independent Quebec, sovereigntists believe that the culture of Québécois and their collective memory – as defined by their intellectual elites – will be adequately protected, in particular against cultural appropriation by other nations – such as the incident with Canada's national anthem, originally a French Canadian patriotic song appropriated by the anglophone majority of Canada. An independent Quebec would also adequately and definitively resolve the issue of needing to protect the French language in Quebec; French is the language of the majority in Quebec, but since it is the language of a cultural minority in Canada – and since Quebec does not have the legislative powers of an independent state – French is still threatened.

Context

Background

Following the British conquest of New France 1760, tension between the francophone and Catholic population of Quebec and the largely Anglophone and Protestant population of the rest of Canada has been a central theme of Canadian history, shaping the early territorial and cultural divisions of the country that persist to this day. Supporters of sovereignty for Quebec believe that the current relationship between Quebec and the rest of Canada does not reflect Quebec's best social, political and economic development interests. Moreover, many subscribe to the notion that without appropriately recognizing that the people of Quebec are culturally distinct, Quebec will remain chronically disadvantaged in favour of the English-Canadian majority.

There is also the question of whether the French language can survive within the geographic boundaries of Quebec. Separatists and Independentists are generally opposed to some aspects of the federal system in Canada and do not believe it can be reformed in a way that could satisfy the needs of Quebec's French-speaking majority. A key component in the argument in favour of overt political independence is that new legislation and a new system of governance could best secure the future development of modern Québécois culture. Additionally, there is wide-ranging debate about defense, monetary policy, currency, international-trade and relations after independence and whether a renewed federalism would give political recognition to the Quebec nation (along with the other 'founding' peoples, including Canadian First Nations, the Inuit, and the British) could satisfy the historic disparities between these cultural "nations" and create a more cohesive and egalitarian Canada.

Several attempts at reforming the federal system in Canada have thus far failed because of, particularly, the conflicting interests between Quebec's representatives and the other provincial governments' representatives. To cite one case, in a recent round of constitutional reform, Elijah Harper, an aboriginal leader from Manitoba, was able to prevent ratification of the agreement in the provincial legislature, arguing that the accord did not address the interests of Canada's aboriginal population. This was a move to recognize that other provinces represent distinct cultural entities, such as the aboriginal population in Canada's Prairies or the people of Newfoundland (which contains significant and culturally distinct French-Canadian, English-Canadian, Irish-Canadian and Aboriginal cultures – and many more).

Contemporary politics

Perhaps the most significant basis of support for Quebec's sovereignty movement lies in more recent political events. For practical purposes, many political pundits use the political career and efforts of René Lévesque as a marker for the beginnings of what is now considered the contemporary movement, although more broadly accepted consensus appears on the contemporary movement finding its origins in a period called the Quiet Revolution.

René Lévesque, architect of the first referendum on sovereignty, claimed a willingness to work for change in the Canadian framework after the federalist victory in the referendum of 1980. This approach was dubbed  ("the beautiful risk"), and it led to many ministers of the Lévesque's government to resign in protest. The constitutional amendment of 1982 was agreed to by representatives from 9 of the 10 provinces (with René Lévesque abstaining). Nonetheless, the constitution is integral to the political and legal systems used in Quebec.

There are numerous possible reasons the 'Yes' campaign went down to defeat: The economy of Quebec suffered measurably following the election of the  Parti Québécois and continued to during the course of the campaign. The Canadian dollar lost much of its value and, during coverage of the dollar's recovery against US currency, there were repeated citations of the referendum and political instability caused by it cited as cause for the fall. Some suggest there were promises of constitutional reform to address outstanding political issues between the province and the federal government, both before and since, without any sign of particularly greater expectation those promises would be filled to any greater or lesser degree. There remains no conclusive evidence that the sovereignty movement derives significant support today because of anything that was promised back in the 1970s.

Proponents of the sovereignty movement sometimes suggest that many people in Quebec feel "bad" for believing the constitutional promises that the federal government and Pierre Trudeau made just before the 1980 Quebec referendum. Those were not delivered on paper or agreed upon in principle by the federal government or the other provincial governments. But, one conclusion that appears to be universal is that one event in particular—dubbed "the night of long knives"—energized the  movement during the 1980s. This event involved a "back-room" deal struck between Trudeau, representing the federal government, and all of the other provinces, save Quebec. It was here that Trudeau was able to gain agreement on the content of the constitutional amendment, while the separatist Premier René Lévesque was left out. And it may well be that a certain number of Quebecers did and may even now feel "bad" both about the nature of that deal and how Trudeau (a Quebecer himself) went about reaching it.

Regardless of Quebec government's refusal to approve the 1982 constitutional amendment because the promised reforms were not implemented, the amendment went into effect. To many in Quebec, the 1982 constitutional amendment without Quebec's approval is still viewed as a historic political wound. The debate still occasionally rages within the province about the best way to heal the rift and the sovereignty movement derives some degree of support from a belief that healing should take the form of separation from Canada.

The failure of the Meech Lake Accord—an abortive attempt to redress the above issues—strengthened the conviction of most  politicians and led many federalist ones to place little hope in the prospect of a federal constitutional reform that would satisfy Quebec's purported historical demands (according to proponents of the sovereignty movement). These include a constitutional recognition that Quebecers constitute a distinct society, as well as a larger degree of independence of the province towards federal policy.

The contemporary sovereignty movement is thought to have originated from the Quiet Revolution of the 1960s, although the desire for an independent or autonomous French-Canadian state has periodically arisen throughout Quebec's history, notably during the 1837 Lower Canada Rebellion. Part of Quebec's continued historical desire for sovereignty is caused by Quebecers' perception of a singular English-speaking voice and identity that is dominant within the parameters of Canadian identity. (This is a point contested in other parts of Canada, particularly in places such as Manitoba, which has a significant French-speaking population and where, in the 1990s, that population tried to assert francophone language rights in schools. The separatist Parti Québécois-led government of Quebec offered up comment actually taking the side of the Manitoba government, which was opposed to granting those rights. Speculation persists that the Quebec government opposed this assertion of francophone identity outside of the province because of the impact it would have on the assertion of anglophone language rights within its own borders.)

For a majority of Quebec politicians, whether  or not, the problem of Quebec's political status is considered unresolved to this day. Although Quebec independence is a political question, cultural concerns are also at the root of the desire for independence.

Legal and constitutional issues
It has been argued by Jeremy Webber and Robert Andrew Young that, as the office is the core of authority in the province, the secession of Quebec from Confederation would first require the abolition or transformation of the post of Lieutenant Governor of Quebec; such an amendment to the constitution of Canada could not be achieved without, according to Section 41 of the Constitution Act, 1982, the approval of the federal parliament and all other provincial legislatures in Canada. Others, such as J. Woehrling, however, have claimed that the legislative process towards Quebec's independence would not require any prior change to the viceregal post. Young also concluded that the lieutenant governor could refuse Royal Assent to a bill that proposed to put an unclear question on sovereignty to referendum or was based on the results of a referendum that asked such a question.

History

Origins
Sovereignty and sovereignism are terms derived from the modern independence movement which started during the Quiet Revolution of the 1960s. However, the roots of Quebecers' desire for political autonomy are much older than that.
 
Francophone nationalism in North America dates back to 1534, the year Jacques Cartier landed in the Gespe'gewa'gi district of Miꞌkmaꞌki claiming Canada for France, and more particularly to 1608, the year of the founding of Québec by Samuel de Champlain, the first permanent settlement for French colonists and their descendants in New France (who were called Canadiens, Canayens or Habitants). Following the British conquest of New France, the Canadien movement, which lasted from 1760 to the late 18th century and sought to restore the traditional rights of French Canadians that had been abolished by the British with the Royal Proclamation of 1763, began. During this period, French Canadians began to express an indigenous form of nationalism which emphasised their longstanding residence in North America. To most French Canadians, the only Canadians were the descendants of the French settlers of New France, while the British colonists were viewed as an extension of Britain. The period was briefly interrupted by the Quebec Act of 1774, which granted certain rights to Canadiens but did not truly satisfy Canadiens, and was notably exacerbated by the Treaty of Paris (1783), which ceded parts of the Quebec to the United States, and the Constitutional Act of 1791, which established the Westminster system.

The patriote movement was the period lasting from the beginning of the 19th century to the defeat of the Patriotes at the Battle of Saint-Eustache in 1838, the final battle in the Patriotes War. It began with the founding of the Parti Canadien by the Canadiens. It stands out for its notorious resistance to the influence of the Château Clique, a group of wealthy families in Lower Canada in the early 19th century who were the Lower Canadian equivalent of the Family Compact in Upper Canada.

 is the period beginning after the defeat of the Patriotes in the rebellions of 1837–1838 and lasting until the Quiet Revolution. It concerns the survival strategies employment by the French-Canadian nation and the ultramontane of the Catholic Church following the enactment of the Act of Union of 1840 which established a system whose goal was to force the cultural and linguistic assimilation of French Canadians into English-Canadian culture. Some French Canadians left Quebec during this period in search of job security and protection of their culture. This phenomenon, better known under the name of “Grande Hémorragie”, is the origin of the Quebec diaspora in New England and Northeastern Ontario among other places. It led to the creation of permanent resistance movements in those new locations. Groups of nationalists outside Quebec have since then promoted Quebec's cultural identity, along with that of the Acadians in the Maritime provinces and in Louisiana, represented by the Société nationale de l'Acadie since 1881. Louis-Alexandre Taschereau coming to power in 1920 created an upheaval in French-Canadian society for most of the interwar period. The confrontations and divergence of political opinions led to the rise of a new form of nationalism, called clerico-nationalism, promoted by Maurice Duplessis and the Union Nationale party during the Grande Noirceur of 1944 to 1959.

During the Quiet Revolution of the 1960s to 1980s, the modern Québécois sovereignist movement took off, with René Lévesque as one of its most recognizable figures. Various strategies were implemented since its rise, and it constitutes a continuity in French-speaking nationalism in America. Now the patriotism is Quebec-focused, and the identifier has been changed from French-Canadian nationalism or identity to Québécois nationalism or identity.

Emergence
The Quiet Revolution in Quebec brought widespread change in the 1960s. Among other changes, support for Quebec independence began to form and grow in some circles. The first organization dedicated to the independence of Quebec was the Alliance Laurentienne, founded by Raymond Barbeau on January 25, 1957.

On September 10, 1960, the Rassemblement pour l'indépendance nationale (RIN) was founded, with Pierre Bourgault quickly becoming its leader. On August 9 of the same year, the Action socialiste pour l'indépendance du Québec (ASIQ) was formed by Raoul Roy. The "independence + socialism" project of the ASIQ was a source of political ideas for the Front de libération du Québec (FLQ).

On October 31, 1962, the Comité de libération nationale and, in November of the same year, the Réseau de résistance were set up. These two groups were formed by RIN members to organize non-violent but illegal actions, such as vandalism and civil disobedience. The most extremist individuals of these groups left to form the FLQ, which, unlike all the other groups, had made the decision to resort to violence in order to reach its goal of independence for Quebec. Shortly after the November 14, 1962, Quebec general election, RIN member Marcel Chaput founded the short-lived Parti républicain du Québec.

In February 1963, the Front de libération du Québec (FLQ) was founded by three Rassemblement pour l'indépendance nationale members who had met each other as part of the Réseau de résistance. They were Georges Schoeters, Raymond Villeneuve, and Gabriel Hudon.

In 1964, the RIN became a provincial political party. In 1965, the more conservative Ralliement national (RN) also became a party.

During this period, the Estates General of French Canada are organized. The stated objective of these Estates General was to consult the French-Canadian people on their constitutional future.

The historical context of the time was a period when many former European colonies, such as Cameroon, Congo, Senegal, Algeria, and Jamaica, were becoming independent. Some advocates of Quebec independence saw Quebec's situation in a similar light; numerous activists were influenced by the writings of Frantz Fanon, Albert Memmi, and Karl Marx. 

In June 1967, French president Charles de Gaulle, who had recently granted independence to Algeria, shouted "" during a speech from the balcony of Montreal's city hall during a state visit to Canada. In doing so, he deeply offended the federal government, and English Canadians felt he had demonstrated contempt for the sacrifice of Canadian soldiers who died on the battlefields of France in two world wars. The visit was cut short and de Gaulle left the country.

Finally, in October 1967, former Liberal cabinet minister René Lévesque left that party when it refused to discuss sovereignty at a party convention. Lévesque formed the Mouvement souveraineté-association and set about uniting pro-sovereignty forces.

He achieved that goal in October 1968 when the MSA held its only national congress in Quebec City. The RN and MSA agreed to merge to form the Parti Québécois (PQ), and later that month Pierre Bourgault, leader of the RIN, dissolved his party and invited its members to join the PQ.

Meanwhile, in 1969 the FLQ stepped up its campaign of violence, which would culminate in what would become known as the October Crisis. The group claimed responsibility for the bombing of the Montreal Stock Exchange, and in 1970 the FLQ kidnapped British Trade Commissioner James Cross and Quebec Labour Minister Pierre Laporte; Laporte was later found murdered.

The early years of the Parti Québécois
Jacques Parizeau joined the party on September 19, 1969, and Jérôme Proulx of the Union Nationale joined on November 11 of the same year.

In the 1970 provincial election, the PQ won its first seven seats in the National Assembly. René Lévesque was defeated in Mont-Royal by the Liberal André Marchand.

The referendum of 1980

In the 1976 election, the PQ won 71 seats — a majority in the National Assembly. With voting turnouts high, 41.4 percent of the electorate voted for the PQ. Prior to the election, the PQ renounced its intention to implement sovereignty-association if it won power.

On August 26, 1977, the PQ passed two main laws: first, the law on the financing of political parties, which prohibits contributions by corporations and unions and set a limit on individual donations, and second, the Charter of the French Language.

On May 17 PQ Member of the National Assembly Robert Burns resigned, telling the press he was convinced that the PQ was going to lose its referendum and fail to be re-elected afterwards.

At its seventh national convention from June 1 to 3, 1979, the  adopted their strategy for the coming referendum. The PQ then began an aggressive effort to promote sovereignty-association by providing details of how the economic relations with the rest of Canada would include free trade between Canada and Quebec, common tariffs against imports, and a common currency. In addition, joint political institutions would be established to administer these economic arrangements.

Sovereignty-association was proposed to the population of Quebec in the 1980 Quebec referendum. The proposal was rejected by 60 percent of the Quebec electorate.

In September, the PQ created a national committee of Anglophones and a liaison committee with ethnic minorities.

The PQ was returned to power in the 1981 election with a stronger majority than in 1976, obtaining 49.2 percent of the vote and winning 80 seats. However, they did not hold a referendum in their second term, and put sovereignty on hold, concentrating on their stated goal of "good government".

René Lévesque retired in 1985 (and died in 1987). In the 1985 election under his successor Pierre-Marc Johnson, the PQ was defeated by the Liberal Party.

Sovereignty-association

The history of the relations between French-Canadians and English-Canadians in Canada has been marked by periods of tension. After colonizing Canada from 1608 onward, France lost the colony to Great Britain at the conclusion of the Seven Years' War in 1763, in which France ceded control of New France (except for the two small islands of Saint Pierre and Miquelon) to Great Britain, which returned the French West Indian islands they had captured in the 1763 Treaty of Paris.

Under British rule, French Canadians were supplanted by waves of British immigrants, notably outside of Quebec (where they became a minority) but within the province as well, as much of the province's economy was dominated by English-Canadians. The cause of Québécois nationalism, which waxed and waned over two centuries, gained prominence from the 1960s onward. The use of the word "sovereignty" and many of the ideas of this movement originated in the 1967 Mouvement Souveraineté-Association of René Lévesque. This movement ultimately gave birth to the Parti Québécois in 1968.

Sovereignty-association is the combination of two concepts:

 The achievement of sovereignty for the Quebec state.
 The creation of a political and economic association between this new independent state and Canada.

It was first presented in Lévesque's political manifesto, Option Québec.

The Parti Québécois defines sovereignty as the power for a state to levy all its taxes, vote on all its laws, and sign all its treaties (as mentioned in the 1980 referendum question).

The type of association between an independent Quebec and the rest of Canada was described as a monetary and customs union as well as joint political institutions to administer the relations between the two countries. The main inspiration for this project was the then-emerging European Community. In Option Québec Lévesque expressly identified the EC as his model for forming a new relationship between sovereign Quebec and the rest of Canada, one that would loosen the political ties while preserving the economic links.  The analogy, however, is counterproductive, suggesting Lévesque did not understand the nature and purpose of the European Community nor the relationship between economics and politics that continue to underpin it.  Advocates of European integration had, from the outset, seen political union as a desirable and natural consequence of economic integration.

The hyphen between the words "sovereignty" and "association" was often stressed by Lévesque and other PQ members, to make it clear that both were inseparable. The reason stated was that if Canada decided to boycott Quebec exports after voting for independence, the new country would have to go through difficult economic times, as the barriers to trade between Canada and the United States were then very high. Quebec would have been a nation of 7 million people stuck between two impenetrable protectionist countries. In the event of having to compete against Quebec, rather than support it, Canada could easily maintain its well-established links with the United States to prosper in foreign trade.

Sovereignty-association as originally proposed would have meant that Quebec would become a politically independent state, but would maintain a formal association with Canada — especially regarding economic affairs. It was part of the 1976  platform which swept the Parti Québécois into power in that year's provincial elections – and included a promise to hold a referendum on sovereignty-association. René Lévesque developed the idea of sovereignty-association to reduce the fear that an independent Quebec would face tough economic times. In fact, this proposal did result in an increase in support for a sovereign Quebec: polls at the time showed that people were more likely to support independence if Quebec maintained an economic partnership with Canada. This line of politics led the outspoken Yvon Deschamps to proclaim that what Quebecers want is an independent Quebec inside a strong Canada, thereby comparing the  movement to a spoiled child that has everything it could desire and still wants more.

In 1979 the PQ began an aggressive effort to promote sovereignty-association by providing details of how the economic relations with the rest of Canada would include free trade between Canada and Quebec, common tariffs against imports, and a common currency. In addition, joint political institutions would be established to administer these economic arrangements. But the  cause was hurt by the refusal of many politicians (most notably the premiers of several of the other provinces) to support the idea of negotiations with an independent Quebec, contributing to the Yes side losing by a vote of 60 percent to 40 percent.

This loss laid the groundwork for the 1995 referendum, which stated that Quebec should offer a new economic and political partnership to Canada before declaring independence. An English translation of part of the Sovereignty Bill reads, "We, the people of Quebec, declare it our own will to be in full possession of all the powers of a state; to levy all our taxes, to vote on all our laws, to sign all our treaties and to exercise the highest power of all, conceiving, and controlling, by ourselves, our fundamental law."

This time, the  lost in a very close vote: 50.6 percent to 49.4 percent, or only 53,498 votes out of more than 4,700,000 votes cast. However, after the vote many within the  camp were very upset that the vote broke down heavily along language lines. Approximately 90 percent of English speakers and allophones (mostly immigrants and first-generation Quebecers whose native language is neither French or English) Quebecers voted against the referendum, while almost 60 percent of Francophones voted Yes. Quebec premier Jacques Parizeau, whose government supported sovereignty, attributed the defeat of the resolution to "money and ethnic votes." His opinion caused an outcry among English-speaking Quebecers, and he resigned following the referendum.

An inquiry by the director-general of elections concluded in 2007 that at least $500,000 was spent by the federalist camp in violation of Quebec's election laws. This law imposes a limit on campaign spending by both option camps. Parizeau's statement was also an admission of failure by the Yes camp in getting the newly arrived Quebecers to adhere to their political option.

Accusations of an orchestrated effort of "election engineering" in several polling stations located in areas with large numbers of non-francophone voters, which resulted in unusually large proportions of rejected ballots, were raised following the 1995 referendum. Afterward, testimony by PQ-appointed polling clerks indicated that they were ordered by PQ-appointed overseers to reject ballots in these polling stations for frivolous reasons that were not covered in the election laws.

While opponents of sovereignty were pleased with the defeat of the referendum, most recognized that there were still deep divides within Quebec and problems with the relationship between Quebec and the rest of the country.

The referendum of 1995

The PQ returned to power in the 1994 election under Jacques Parizeau, this time with 44.75% of the popular vote. In the intervening years, the failures of the Meech Lake Accord and Charlottetown Accord had revived support for sovereignty, which had been written off as a dead issue for much of the 1980s.

Another consequence of the failure of the Meech Lake Accord was the formation of the Bloc Québécois (BQ), a  federal political party, under the leadership of the charismatic former Progressive Conservative federal cabinet minister Lucien Bouchard. Several PC and Liberal members of the federal parliament left their parties to form the BQ. For the first time, the PQ supported pro-sovereigntist forces running in federal elections; during his lifetime Lévesque had always opposed such a move.

The Union Populaire had nominated candidates in the 1979 and 1980 federal elections, and the Parti nationaliste du Québec had nominated candidates in the 1984 election, but neither of these parties enjoyed the official support of the PQ; nor did they enjoy significant public support among Quebecers.

In the 1993 federal election, which featured the collapse of Progressive Conservative Party support, the BQ won enough seats in Parliament to become Her Majesty's Loyal Opposition in the House of Commons.

At the Royal Commission on the Future of Quebec (also known as the Outaouais Commission) in 1995, the Marxist-Leninist Party of Canada made a presentation in which the party leader, Hardial Bains, recommended to the committee that Quebec declare itself as an independent republic.

Parizeau promptly advised the Lieutenant Governor to call a new referendum. The 1995 referendum question differed from the 1980 question in that the negotiation of an association with Canada was now optional. The open-ended wording of the question resulted in significant confusion, particularly amongst the 'Yes' side, as to what exactly they were voting for. This was a primary motivator for the creation of the Clarity Act (see below).

The "No" campaign won, but only by a very small margin — 50.6% to 49.4%. As in the previous referendum, the English-speaking (anglophone) minority in Quebec overwhelmingly (about 90%) rejected sovereignty, support for sovereignty was also weak among allophones (native speakers of neither English nor French) in immigrant communities and first-generation descendants. The lowest support for the Yes side came from Mohawk, Cree, and Inuit voters in Quebec, some first Nations chiefs asserted their right to self-determination with the Cree being particularly vocal in their right to stay territories within Canada. More than 96% of the Inuit and Cree voted No in the referendum. However, The Innu, Attikamek, Algonquin and Abenaki nations did partially support Quebec sovereignty. In 1985, 59 percent of Quebec's Inuit population, 56 percent of the Attikamek population, and 49 percent of the Montagnais population voted in favour of the Sovereignist Parti Québécois party. That year, three out of every four native reservations gave a majority to the Parti Québécois party.

By contrast almost 60 percent of francophones of all origins voted "Yes". (82 percent of Quebecers are Francophone.) Later inquiries into irregularities determined that abuses had occurred on both sides: some argue that some "No" ballots had been rejected without valid reasons, and the October 27 "No" rally had evaded spending limitations because of out-of-province participation. An inquiry by "Le Directeur général des élections" concluded in 2007 that the "No" camp had exceeded the campaign spending limits by $500,000.

Quebec general election, 1998
Expecting Bouchard to announce another referendum if his party won the 1998 Quebec general election, the leaders of all other provinces and territories gathered for the Calgary Declaration in September 1997 to discuss how to oppose the sovereignty movement. Saskatchewan's Roy Romanow warned "It's two or three minutes to midnight". Bouchard did not accept his invitation; organizers did not invite Chrétien. Experts debated whether Quebec was a "distinct society" or "unique culture".

The Parti Québécois won re-election despite losing the popular vote to Jean Charest and the Quebec Liberals. In the number of seats won by both sides, the election was almost a clone of the previous 1994 election. However, public support for sovereignty remained too low for the PQ to consider holding a second referendum during their second term. Meanwhile, the federal government passed the Clarity Act to govern the wording of any future referendum questions and the conditions under which a vote for sovereignty would be recognized as legitimate. Federal Liberal politicians stated that the ambiguous wording of the 1995 referendum question was the primary impetus in the bill's drafting.

While opponents of sovereignty were pleased with their referendum victories, most recognized that there are still deep divides within Quebec and problems with the relationship between Quebec and the rest of Canada.

Clarity Act, 1999
In 1999, the Parliament of Canada, at the urging of Prime Minister Jean Chrétien, passed the Clarity Act, a law that, amongst other things, set out the conditions under which the Crown-in-Council would recognize a vote by any province to leave Canada. It required a majority of eligible voters for a vote to trigger secession talks, not merely a plurality of votes. In addition, the act requires a clear question of secession to initiate secession talks. Controversially, the act gave the House of Commons the power to decide whether a proposed referendum question was considered clear, and allowed it to decide whether a clear majority has expressed itself in any referendum. Chrétien considered the legislation among his most significant accomplishments.

Present

"Sovereignty-Association" is nowadays more often referred to simply as "sovereignty". However, in the 1995 Quebec referendum, in which the sovereignty option was narrowly rejected, the notion of some form of economic association with the rest of Canada was still envisaged (continuing use of the Canadian dollar and military, for example) and was referred to as "Sovereignty-Partnership". It remains a part of the PQ program and is tied to national independence in the minds of most Quebecers. This part of the PQ program has always been controversial, especially since Canadian federal politicians usually refuse the concept.

The new program and the revised sovereignty project was adopted at the 2005 Congress.

In the 2003 election, the PQ lost power to the Liberal Party. However, in early 2004, the Liberal government of Paul Martin had proved to be unpopular, and that, combined with the federal Liberal Party sponsorship scandal, contributed to a resurgence of the BQ. In the 2004 federal elections, the Bloc Québécois won 54 of Quebec's 75 seats in the House of Commons, compared to 33 previously. However, in the 2006 federal elections the BQ lost three seats and in the 2008 federal elections lost two additional seats, bringing their total down to 49, but was still the most popular federal party in Quebec up until the 2011 Canadian federal election, when the BQ was devastated by the federalist NDP, with the Bloc at a total of four seats and the loss of official party status in the Commons (compared to the NDP's 59 seats, Conservatives' five seats, and the Liberals' seven seats in Quebec).

Polling data by Angus Reid in June 2009 showed the support for Quebec separation was very weak at the time and separatism unlikely to occur in the near future. Polling data showed that 32% of Quebecers believe that Quebec had enough sovereignty and should remain part of Canada, 28% thought they should separate, and 30% say they believe that Quebec does need greater sovereignty but should remain part of Canada. However the poll did reveal that a majority (79%) of Quebecers still desired to achieve more autonomy. The number one area of autonomy that those polled had hoped for was with regard to culture at 34%, the next highest areas of autonomy cherished were the economy at 32%, taxation at 26%, and immigration and the environment at 15% each.

The 2009 Angus Reid poll also revealed some effects of the Clarity Act in which they asked two questions, one a straightforward question for a separate nation, and the other a more muddled version on separation similar to the one posed in the 1995 referendum. The data on the questions revealed as follows to the first hard line question of "Do you believe that Quebec should become a country separate from Canada?" 34% replied yes, 54% said no, and 13% were unsure. To the less clear question of "Do you agree that Quebec should become sovereign after having made a formal offer to Canada for a new economic and political partnership within a scope of the bill respecting the future of Quebec?" support for separation increased to 40% yes, the no vote still led with 41%, and the unsure increased to 19%. The most startling revelation of the poll was in the fact that only 20% or 1 in 5 polled believed that Quebec would ever separate from Canada.

2011 was considered a watershed year for the  movement. In the aftermath of the 2011 federal election, Léger Marketing and pro- newspaper Le Devoir conducted a poll on the question. When asked whether they would vote Yes or No in the event of a referendum, 41% of the respondents said they would vote Yes. In 2011, the  movement splintered, with several new parties being formed by disaffected politicians, with some politicians dissatisfied with slow progress towards independence, and others hoping to put the sovereignty question on the backburner. Leadership by PQ leader Pauline Marois was divisive.

In 2021, François Legault's Coalition Avenir Québec government in Quebec proposed to amend the Charter of the French Language and the provincial constitution to more strongly entrench French as the sole official language. In response to this, the Bloc Québécois initiated a motion in the House of Commons endorsing the constitutionality of Legault's initiatives. The Commons passed the motion 281–2. There were 36 abstentions.

organizations

Political parties and parliamentary groups
 Parti Québécois
 SPQ Libre
 Bloc Québécois
 Communist Party of Canada
 Québec solidaire
 Option nationale
 Parti indépendantiste
 Marxist–Leninist Party of Quebec
 Groupe parlementaire québécois

Non-partisan organizations
 Mouvement pour une Élection sur la Souveraineté
 Mouvement de libération nationale du Québec
 Conseil de la Souveraineté du Québec
 Réseau de Résistance du Québécois

Sympathetic organizations
Saint-Jean-Baptiste Society
 Confédération des syndicats nationaux (Confederation of national labour unions)
 Centrale des syndicats du Québec (Quebec labour unions congress)
 Fédération des travailleurs et travailleuses du Québec (Federation of Quebec workers)
 Union des artistes (Artists Labour Union)
 Mouvement national des Québécois et des Québécoises

media
 Québecor
Journal de Montréal
Journal de Québec
Groupe TVA
 
 
 
 
 
 
 
  (defunct)
 
 
 Québec-Radio
 Vigile

Past organizations

 Rassemblement pour l'indépendance nationale (RIN)
 Front de libération du Québec (FLQ)
 Parti nationaliste chrétien (PNC)
 Parti nationaliste du Québec
 Parti indépendantiste (1985)
 Union Populaire
 Nouvelle Alliance Québec-Canada
 Action démocratique du Québec – was originally sovereigntist, but later abandoned in favour of considerable autonomy

Arguments

Reasons for sovereignty
Justifications for Quebec's sovereignty are historically nationalistic in character, claiming the unique culture and French-speaking majority (78% of the provincial population) are threatened with assimilation by either the rest of Canada or, as in Metropolitan France, by Anglophone culture more generally, and that the best way to preserve language, identity and culture is via the creation of an independent political entity. Other distinguishing factors, such as religious differences (given the Catholic majority in Quebec), are also used to justify either separation or nationalist social policies advocated by the Parti Québécois.

The historical argument for Quebec independence stems from the region's history, as it was conquered by the British in 1760 and ceded to Great Britain in the 1763 Treaty of Paris; French Canadians in Canada were subsumed by waves of British immigrants. This argument makes the claim that Quebecers have the right of self-determination.

Eight of the other Canadian provinces are overwhelmingly (greater than 95%) English-speaking, while New Brunswick is officially bilingual and about one-third Francophone. Another rationale is based on resentment of anti-Quebec sentiment. With regard to the creation of the  movement, language issues were but a sub-stratum of larger cultural, social and political differences. Many scholars point to historical events as framing the cause for ongoing support for sovereignty in Quebec, while more contemporary politicians may point to the aftermath of more recent developments like the Canada Act of 1982, the Meech Lake Accord or the Charlottetown Accord.

Arguments against sovereignty
In a series of letters throughout the 1990s, Stéphane Dion (the federal Intergovernmental Affairs Minister at the time) laid out an argument against sovereignty.

It has also been argued by prominent Quebecers ( and ex-, including former Quebec premier Lucien Bouchard) that sovereignty politics has distracted Quebecers from the real economic problems of Quebec, and that sovereignty by itself cannot solve those problems. In 2005 they published their position statement, "Pour un Québec lucide", ("For a lucid Quebec") which details the problems facing Quebec.

Many federalists oppose the Quebec sovereignty movement for economic and political reasons but many also oppose sovereignty on other grounds. For example, since the 1995 referendum, in regards to the declaration of Jacques Parizeau who blamed the loss on "money and ethnic votes", many federalists considered the sovereignty movement as an expression of ethnic nationalism.

Additionally, those in favour of Canadian federalism denounce Quebec separation as a 'Balkanization' of Canada.

Some arguments against sovereignty claim that the movement is illegitimate because of its Eurocentrism which alienates many among Canada's First Nations, as well as the Inuit, and Métis peoples and their sympathizers. This sentiment is summed up by a quotation from a Mohawk from Akwsasne: "How can Quebec, with no economic base and no land base, ask to become sovereign? How can Quebec be a nation when they have no constitution? We have had a constitution since before the American revolution." Here the argument expresses the claim that the Mohawk nation has a greater case for self-determination due to already having a more legitimate claim to distinct nationhood that is based on traditional lands and a constitution predating confederation as well as the creation of Quebec and a Québécois identity.

Similarly, the Cree have also asserted for many years that they are a separate people with the right to self-determination recognized under international law. They argue that no annexation of them or their territory to an independent Quebec should take place without their consent, and that if Quebec has the right to leave Canada then the Cree people have the right to choose to keep their territory in Canada. Cree arguments generally do not claim the right to secede from Canada; rather, the Cree see themselves as a people bound to Canada by treaty (see the James Bay and Northern Quebec Agreement), and as citizens of Canada. The Cree have stated that a unilateral declaration of independence by Quebec would be a violation of fundamental principles of human rights, democracy and consent. If secession were to proceed, the Cree argue that they would seek protection through the Canadian courts as well as asserting Cree jurisdiction over its people and lands.

Professor Peter Russell has said of Aboriginal peoples in Canada: "(they) are not nations that can be yanked out of Canada against their will by a provincial majority.... With few exceptions (they) wish to enjoy their right to self-government within Canada, not within a sovereign Quebec." International human rights expert Erica-Irene Daes says the change "will leave the most marginalized and excluded of all the world's peoples without a legal, peaceful weapon to press for genuine democracy...." This concern is connected to the claim that if Quebec were to be considered its own autonomous nation-state then it need not honour the treaties and agreements that were signed between First Nations and the British and French Crowns and are now maintained by the Canadian federal government. Concern for this may stem from perception of neo-colonial or eurocentric attitudes in the leadership of former Quebec premiers, such as Robert Bourassa, the self-proclaimed "Conqueror of the North".

Allies and opponents

Allies

Quebecois
The separatist movement draws from the left and right spectrum; a sizeable minority of more conservative Quebecers supporting the PQ's political agenda because of the sovereignty issue, despite reservations about its social democratic political agenda.

Right and Left must be interpreted within the provincial context; Liberal Party politics generally coincide with those of other liberal parties, while PQ politics are more social democratic in orientation. There is no mass conservative movement in Quebec's political culture on the provincial level, due notably to strong government interventionism and Keynesianism shared by all parties since the 1960s (the so-called "Quebec Consensus" since the Quiet Revolution), and the province's Catholic heritage.

There are, of course, quite a few exceptions. Notable examples include:

 the conservative but nationalist Action Démocratique du Québec supporting the Yes side in the 1995 Quebec referendum. They now support Quebec Autonomism: a decentralized view of the Canadian Confederation, and accept the 1995 "No" verdict;

France

This used to be a paradoxical phenomenon because of the Parti Québécois and most  being to the political left and supporters of Quebec remaining a province tend to be politically on the right. Michel Rocard (who became Prime Minister of the French Republic) has been one of the French Socialists that broke that so-called rule the most, maintaining a close and warm relationship with Quebec . More recently, Ségolène Royal, a leader of the French Socialist Party, indicated support for "Quebec sovereignty" but it was seemingly a reflexive answer to an "out of the blue" question from a Quebec journalist in Paris. On a later visit to Quebec City she gave a more nuanced position, mentioning a Parliamentary motion recognizing the Québécois as a nation, but also describing 400 years of oppression and resistance of francophones in Canada.

The French Foreign Office motto concerning Quebec's national question is "non-ingérence et non-indifférence" ("no interference and no indifference"), which epitomizes the official position of the French State. In other words, while the Quebec people vote to stay within Canada, France will officially support the Canadian Confederation the way it is.

Former French President Nicolas Sarkozy has stated on the record that he opposes the separation of Quebec from Canada. This changed back to the view of the French Foreign Office under Sarkozy's successor, François Hollande.

Opponents

Rest of Canada
The other nine provinces of Canada have generally been opposed to Quebec sovereignty.  Aside from marginal movements, the only major secessionist movement in English Canada has been the Maritimes Anti-Confederation movement immediately after Confederation occurred.

In general, francophones outside Quebec oppose sovereignty or any form of national recognition for Quebec, while non-francophones, particularly the anglophone minority in Montreal, also have remained opposed. After polling heavily on the subject, marketing firm president Mark Leger concluded: “These numbers surprise me, they're so clear across the country.... You look at Francophones outside Quebec, it's the same result.... Overall, outside the French in Quebec, all the other groups across the country are against this notion.” The exact question of the November 2006 poll was, "Currently, there is a political debate on recognizing Quebec as a nation. Do you personally consider that Quebecers form a nation or not?" Canadians from every region outside Quebec, non-Francophone Quebecers (62 percent), Francophone Canadians outside Quebec (77 percent) all rejected the idea.

Anglophones and immigrants in Quebec
Sovereignty has very little support among Quebec Anglophones or immigrant communities. About 60% of Francophones voted "Yes" in 1995, and with the exception of weak "Yes" support from Haitian, Arab and Latin American communities, most non-Francophones massively voted "No" (see Demolinguistics of Quebec). The opponents of the sovereignty movement view the project as ethnically exclusive, based on its rejection by non-Francophones. This position is disputed by the PQ, which claims its goal is all-embracing and essentially civic in nature.

Opinion polls

Archive of polls from 1962 until January 2008

Economic effect
For many years, federalists claimed that sovereignist political parties and referendums hurt Quebec's economy. However, one study found that Quebec's sovereignists did not have a largely negative impact on Quebec's economy as sometimes seen with other independence movements in other countries because they were not violent.

Quebec sovereignty movement in fiction

 Richard Rohmer's novel Separation (1976) was turned into a TV-movie for CTV Television in 1977. In the movie, the Parti Québécois has formed the government of Quebec but Premier Gaston Bélisle has repeatedly put off its promise to hold a referendum. International politics forces Bélisle's hand.
 In the mid-1980s, a second movie, Quebec-Canada 1995, depicts a meeting between the president of Quebec and the prime minister of Canada to discuss a crisis involving Quebec military occupations of parts of Ontario and New Brunswick. Canada's armed forces are stretched thin with peacekeepers in such varied places as the Falkland Islands (with "Lady Goosegreen" being Margaret Thatcher).
 William Weintraub's satirical 1979 novel The Underdogs provoked controversy by imagining a future Quebec in which English-speakers were an oppressed minority, complete with a violent resistance movement. One planned stage version was cancelled before its premiere.
 Clive Cussler's 1984 novel Night Probe! is set against a fictional attempt at secession in the late 1980s. Rights to newly discovered oil resources in Ungava Bay, discovered as Quebec moves to secede, clash with the ramifications of a rediscovered secret treaty negotiated between the U.K. and U.S. governments during World War I.
 David Foster Wallace's novel Infinite Jest includes both real and fictional Québécois separatist movements as integral to the plot. In the story, the United States has merged with Canada and Mexico to form the Organization of North American Nations (ONAN). Wheelchair-using Quebec separatists use a video so entertaining it leads to death to accomplish their goals of both Quebec independence and the end of the ONAN.
 In the Southern Victory Series of alternate history novels by Harry Turtledove, Quebec becomes a separate nation during the First Great War (an alternative World War I), in which the United States defeats Canada, the United Kingdom and the other Entente Powers (including the Confederate States of America); upon its founding, the Republic is officially recognised only by the Central Powers of the United States, Germany, Austria-Hungary, Bulgaria, the Ottoman Empire, the puppet states of Poland and Ukraine, and the neutral powers of Italy and the Netherlands. Since the United States organized this separation to weaken Anglophone Canada (and the UK by extension) and to aid in the post-war occupation of Canada, the Republic of Quebec operated as a client state of the United States, rather than being truly independent. This is later demonstrated in the series when Québécois soldiers release their US counterparts from occupation duties in Canada during the Second Great War, allowing the United States to focus its military efforts against the Confederacy. The Republic of Quebec in this alternate timeline is in a similar geopolitical situation to the Kingdom of Poland, a German puppet state created as part of Mitteleuropa. Its head of state is styled as Premier, and its national legislature either includes or is called the House of Deputies.
 In DC Comics, the villain (and sometimes hero) Plastique is initially a Québécois freedom fighter, who resorts to acts of terrorism.
 In Marvel Comics, the superhero Northstar was part of the Front de libération du Québec (FLQ) in his youth.
 In Axis Powers Hetalia, Canada's nightmare features an independent Quebec.
 Margaret Atwood's 1979 novel Life Before Man is set in Toronto in the late 1970s and several characters watch and sometimes comment upon the elections and sovereignist movement in Quebec. The sovereignist movement and its struggles are metaphorically linked to the difficulties the characters in the novel have with separating their own personal relationships.
 In the roleplaying game Trinity there are references made to a separatist Quebec nation who in return for independence helped the then formed 'Confederated States of America' take control of Canada.
 In the novel Babylon Babies by the French-born Canadian cyberpunk writer Maurice Dantec, loosely adapted as the film Babylon A.D., Quebec is independent and referred to as the "Free Province of Quebec".
 In the roleplaying game Shadowrun, Quebec exists as a sovereign nation alongside the United Canadian American States and the Confederated American States.
 In the film Die Hard, Hans Gruber, the terrorist leader, demands, as a ruse, the release of imprisoned members of the fictional group Liberté du Québec. (Presumably meant to be a fictional version of the FLQ.)
 In Peter Watts' science fiction series, starting with Starfish, Quebec has attained sovereignty and is an energetic/economic superpower within North America.
 In the alternate history novel The Two Georges, co-authored by Richard Dreyfuss and Harry Turtledove, the American Revolution never occurs, resulting in the creation of the North American Union, a dominion of the British Empire. En route to the Six Nations, Thomas Bushell and Samuel Stanley of the Royal American Mounted Police discuss the nearby province of Quebec. Stanley muses that, being culturally French, the Québécois people would want to split off from the N.A.U. to become part of the Franco-Spanish Holy Alliance. However, the Francophobia of the Sons of Liberty prevents them from effectively joining forces with Québécois separatists.
 In the Simpsons episode "Homer to the Max", Homer Simpson is invited to an exclusive garden party by Trent Steel, a successful businessman whom he meets as a result of changing his name to Max Power. President Bill Clinton, a guest at the garden party, is called away to deal with Quebec 'getting the bomb'.
 In The Critic episode "L.A. Jay", in a dream sequence, Jay Sherman, at his Oscar acceptance speech says he supports independence for Quebec, cutting to a room of Québécois saying "Viva Jay Sherman! Viva Quebec!" and unfurling a banner depicting Sherman as a beaver.
 In the young adults' alternate history novel The Disunited States of America by Harry Turtledove, the United States collapsed in the 1800s due to the retention of the Articles of Confederation, with states becoming sovereign nations by the 2090s. Quebec is an independent country in the 2090s, although it is not mentioned whether it remained an independent entity or seceded from a Canadian union.

Explanatory notes

See also
 Canadian sovereignty
 List of subjects related to the Quebec independence movement
 Lists of active separatist movements
 Politics of Quebec
 Secessionist movements of Canada

References

Further reading
 Clarke, Harold D., and Allan Kornberg. "Choosing Canada? The 1995 Quebec Sovereignty Referendum." PS, Political Science & Politics 29.4 (1996): 676+.
 Des Granges, Cara. "Finding Legitimacy: Examining Quebec Sovereignty from Pre-Confederation to Present." International Journal of Canadian Studies 50 (2014): 25–44.
 Jacobs, Jane. The question of separatism: Quebec and the struggle over sovereignty (Vintage, 2016).
 McCulloch, Tony. "A quiet revolution in diplomacy: Quebec–UK relations since 1960." American Review of Canadian Studies 46.2 (2016): 176–195. online
 Mendelsohn, Matthew. "Rational choice and socio-psychological explanation for opinion on Quebec sovereignty." Canadian Journal of Political Science/Revue canadienne de science politique (2003): 511–537 online.
 Somers, Kim, and François Vaillancourt. "Some economic dimensions of the sovereignty debate in Quebec: debt, GDP, and migration." Oxford Review of Economic Policy 30.2 (2014): 237–256.
 Yale, François, and Claire Durand. "What did Quebeckers want? Impact of question wording, constitutional proposal and context on support for sovereignty, 1976–2008." American Review of Canadian Studies 41.3 (2011): 242–258. online

External links
UNESCO article on the evolution of Quebec nationalism (2002) (Archived)
 Parti Québécois website  (partly in English)
 Québec Solidaire 
 Parti Communiste du Québec 
 Bloc Québécois website  (partly in English)
 Saint-Jean-Baptiste Society website  (partly in English)
 The Question of Separatism: Quebec and the Struggle over Sovereignty by Jane Jacobs.